Rosemary Marcus is a female Nigerian professional cyclist. She won a gold medal while representing Nigeria in the women's time trial cycling event alongside Happiness Okafor, Glory Odiase, and Gripa Tombrapa at the 2015 All-Africa Games in Congo Brazzaville.

References

External links
Rosemary Marcus on Cycling Database

Living people
Cyclists from Rivers State
Nigerian female cyclists
Sportswomen from Rivers State
African Games gold medalists for Nigeria
African Games medalists in cycling
Year of birth missing (living people)
Competitors at the 2015 African Games
21st-century Nigerian women